Charanjit Singh Walia was an Indian politician. He was elected to the Lok Sabha, lower house of the Parliament of India as a member of the Akali Dal.

References

India MPs 1984–1989
Lok Sabha members from Punjab, India
Shiromani Akali Dal politicians
1930s births
Year of birth uncertain
2013 deaths
Ahluwalia